Horde is the third studio album by the free improvisation ensemble Mnemonist Orchestra, released in 1981 by Dys Records.

Track listing

Personnel 
Adapted from the Horde liner notes.

Mnemonists
 Mark Derbyshire – cello, crumhorn, sampler, tape, production, engineering
 Steve Scholbe – alto saxophone, clarinet, electric guitar, production
 William Sharp – piano, tape, clarinet, spoken word, production
 Sara Thompson – double bass, piano

Additional musicians
 Amy Derbyshire – viola and crumhorn (A4), recorder (A6)
 Crystal Goldberg – bass guitar (B1)
 Mark Heglund – bass guitar (A2)
 Torger Hougen – spoken word, illustrations
 Tom Katsimpalis – spoken word, illustrations
 Ken Lark – drums (A2, B4)
 Randy Yeates – spoken word, illustrations
Production and additional personnel
 James Dixon – cover art, illustrations

Release history

References

External links 
 

1981 albums
Biota (band) albums
Recommended Records albums
Sound collage albums